Jonas Neubauer (April 19, 1981 – January 5, 2021) was an American Tetris player, seven-time champion at the Classic Tetris World Championship, Twitch streamer, and a taproom manager.

Early life 
Neubauer began playing Tetris at the age of 6 or 7 on his uncle's Compact Macintosh computer and started playing the NES version at age 9. In November 2006, he provided the first-known recording of a "max-out" game (999,999 points), and in September 2008 he uploaded the first recording of a max-out achieved from a Level-19 start.

Classic Tetris World Championship

2010: Debut 

Neubauer was invited to the inaugural Classic Tetris World Championship in 2010 by virtue of being one of the two people to max-out the game, with the other being Harry Hong. Neubauer advanced to the final, where he defeated Harry Hong 2–0 to become the first-ever champion in the Classic Tetris World Championship. Neubauer's victory was covered in the award-winning documentary Ecstasy of Order: The Tetris Masters (2011).

2011–2013: Continued success 

In 2011, Neubauer successfully defended his title after defeating Alex Kerr 2–0 in the finals. In 2012, Neubauer successfully defended his title for the second time after defeating Mike Winzineck 3–0 in the finals. In 2013, Jonas was once again able to defend his title for the third time, defeating rival Harry Hong 3–2 after being down 0–2. This marked the first time Neubauer lost a round in the finals and made him a 4-time Classic World Tetris champion and the sole champion of the competition up until this point.

2014: First CTWC defeat 

Neubauer participated again in 2014, looking to defend his title for the fourth straight time. Neubauer made it to the finals, setting up a rematch with the previous year's finalist Harry Hong. Despite taking an early 1–0 lead, Neubauer was defeated 1–3 by Hong. This marked the first time Neubauer was defeated in competition, and it was Harry Hong's first and so far only Classic Tetris World Championship victory. After the tournament, Neubauer contemplated retirement but was convinced to keep competing by his wife.

2015–2017: New streak 

In 2015, Neubauer returned to the competition motivated to claim his fifth title. He was once again able to reach the finals, where he defeated surprise finalist Sean Ritchie 3–1, successfully reclaiming the title after the previous year's defeat. Neubauer won his sixth title in 2016 after defeating first-time finalist Jeff Moore 3–1, in what is considered as the most popular Classic World Tetris Championship match in the competition's history, sparking renewed interest in the game and the competition. In 2017, Neubauer won his seventh title after defeating former finalist Alex Kerr 3–0 in the finals. Neubauer dropped only one game during the entirety of the competition during the quarterfinals against veteran Chad Muse. This was Neubauer's final title in the competition.

2018–2020: Final competition years 

Before the 2018 tournament, Neubauer expected increased competition due to the rise of the "hypertapping" style, naming Koji Nishio as the favorite to win the title. After qualifying as the third seed, Neubauer slowly made his way to the semifinals, where he set up a thriller match against first-time competitor Tomohiro Tatejima (aka GreenTea). Neubauer was able to defeat Tatejima 2–1 in a close battle to reach the finals. There, he was swept 0–3 by hypertapping sensation Joseph Saelee despite setting competition personal bests. During his post-match interview, when asked if he was contemplating retirement, Neubauer reaffirmed that he plans to keep competing indefinitely regardless of whether he was the favorite to win or not. In 2019, Neubauer returned to the competition, looking to reclaim his title, but shockingly he was upset 1–2 in the first round by veteran competitor Paul Tesi, marking the first time Neubauer didn't reach the finals in a competition. In 2020, the Classic Tetris World Championship was held online due to the COVID-19 pandemic. Now playing under the Spanish flag as an in-joke, Neubauer qualified as the 31st seed after struggling during qualifying, only managing one max-out. Although expectations were low for DAS players like Neubauer after the domination of hypertapping in past competitions, he was able to make it to the Top 16 before being defeated 1–3 by eventual semifinalist Jacob Huff. During his post-match interview, a visibly emotional Neubauer expressed his gratitude and excitement for the ever-rising popularity of the tournament. This was Neubauer's final competition.

World record holder 

In June 2018, Neubauer set a (then) high-score world record of 1,245,200 points.

Other ventures

Television appearance 
On June 9, 2019, Neubauer was a panelist on ABC's To Tell the Truth, where he was one of three who had to fool celebrities into thinking that he was the Lego Master Builder. After the real Lego Master Builder was revealed, the celebrities then had to figure out which of the two remaining panelists was a performer who walks barefoot on Lego bricks (a "Lego walker"). The celebrities competing during that episode were Oliver Hudson, Justin Long, Snoop Dogg, and Amanda Seales.

Death
Neubauer died from a sudden medical emergency on January 5, 2021, at age 39. He had collapsed and never regained consciousness. His death was announced four days later on all of his social media pages. On April 2, 2021, the cause of death was diagnosed as "sudden cardiac death from cardiac arrhythmia of undetermined [cause]". 

For the 2021 event, the Classic Tetris World Championship trophy was renamed the Jonas Neubauer Memorial Trophy, and redesigned as a golden J-tetromino (representing "J" for "Jonas").

References

External links
Twitch channel
YouTube channel
Twitter account

1981 births
2021 deaths
Tetris
American esports players
Sportspeople from Los Angeles